Allemond (spelled Allemont by the local council) is a commune in the Isère department in the Auvergne-Rhône-Alpes region of south-eastern France.

The inhabitants of the commune are known as Allemondins or Allemondines

Geography
Allemond is a small mountain village in the heart of the Oisans in the valley of the Eau d'Olle, at the foot of the Belledonne mountains in the Grandes Rousses basin. It is located some 20 km east of Saint-Martin-d'Hères and 30 km south of Pontcharra. Access to the commune is by the D526 road from the south which passes through the village then continues north along the eastern border of the commune before turning west. The commune consists of high mountains with forests on the lower slopes.

Localities and hamlets in the commune

 La traverse (1300 m high)
 Le clot
 La rivoire
 La combe
 Le Mas des Croze
 Le village
 Les grands champs
 La ville
 La fondrie
 La pernière haute et basse
 Pissevache
 Farnier
 Champeau
 Le villaret
 La drayrie
 Baton (700 m high)
 Coteysard
 Le Mollard
 Le Rivier
 L'eau Dolle
 Les 4 saisons

Neighbouring communes and villages

History
The first buildings were built in the town in the Middle Ages.

Until the 1960s the life of the people was very simple: they were mainly farmers and herders.

The city also had mining activity under Louis XIII and Louis XIV. It housed the Royal foundries in which ore from mines in the town - mainly silver, lead, and copper - were melted down. Part of the buildings from the former royal foundry long housed the hotel called "Les Tilleuls" (now closed). This hotel with its beautiful walnut staircase was bought in 1920 by a former mayor of the town (for 40 years). His two daughters, Marguerite and Raymonde Giroutru, local personalities, then controlled the propertry for a long time. It was said that Napoleon III stayed at the hotel.

In the late 1970s, the Grand Maison Dam project was launched, it was an economic windfall for the commune and the whole region. The project lasted 10 years and brought in hundreds of workers.

The communes involved were able to invest in tourism and winter sports equipment so ensuring their future once the work was finished.

Today the commune lives completely on tourism both in summer and winter.

Administration

List of Successive Mayors

Demography
In 2017, the commune had 971 inhabitants.

Sites and monuments

Religious heritage
The Church contains a Bronze Bell (1657) which is registered as an historical object.

Civil heritage

The Oven of faure
The tower

See also
Communes of the Isère department

References

External links
Allemont official website 
Allemond on Géoportail, National Geographic Institute (IGN) website 
Allemont on the 1750 Cassini Map

Communes of Isère
Dauphiné